William George "Billy" Saward (15 September 1868 in Thurrock – 1944 in Thurrock) was a British long-distance runner who competed at the 1900 Summer Olympics in Paris, France. Saward competed in the marathon.  He was one of six runners who did not finish the race.

References

External links

 De Wael, Herman. Herman's Full Olympians: "Athletics 1900". Accessed 18 March 2006.
 

1868 births
1944 deaths
Athletes (track and field) at the 1900 Summer Olympics
Olympic athletes of Great Britain
British male long-distance runners
British male marathon runners
People from Thurrock
Sportspeople from Essex
Date of death missing